Naser Al-Meqlad (also Naser Meqlad, ; born August 12, 1982 in Kuwait City) is a Kuwaiti sport shooter. He won two gold medals for the individual trap shooting at the 2006 Asian Games in Doha, Qatar, and at the 2010 Asian Games in Guangzhou, China.

At age twenty-one, Meqlad made his official debut for the 2004 Summer Olympics in Athens, where he finished fourteenth out of thirty-five shooters in the qualifying rounds of the men's trap, with a score of 117 points, tying his position with five other shooters, including Germany's Karsten Bindrich.

At the 2008 Summer Olympics in Beijing, Meqlad competed for the second time in men's trap shooting, where was able to fire 71 targets on the first day, and 44 on the second day, for a total score of 115 points, finishing only in eighteenth place.

References

External links
 

1982 births
Asian Games medalists in shooting
Kuwaiti male sport shooters
Living people
Olympic shooters of Kuwait
Sportspeople from Kuwait City
Shooters at the 2004 Summer Olympics
Shooters at the 2006 Asian Games
Shooters at the 2008 Summer Olympics
Shooters at the 2010 Asian Games
Asian Games gold medalists for Kuwait
Medalists at the 2006 Asian Games
Medalists at the 2010 Asian Games